Ilmatsalu is a small borough in the Tartu urban municipality, Tartu County, Estonia. As of 2011 Census, the settlement's population was 392.

References 

Boroughs and small boroughs in Estonia